Pierson Township is a civil township of Montcalm County in the U.S. state of Michigan. The population was 2,866 at the 2000 census. The Village of Pierson is located within the township.

History 
The historical tribes inhabiting the region were the Ottawa, Chippewa and Potawatomi. 
Settlers began arriving in the 1830s.

Geography

Demographics
As of the census of 2000, there were 2,866 people, 1,015 households, and 795 families residing in the township. The racial makeup of the township was 96.27% White, 0.07% African American, 0.87% Native American, 0.28% Asian, 0.10% Pacific Islander, 0.59% from other races, and 1.81% from two or more races. Hispanic or Latino of any race were 1.36% of the population.

There were 1,015 households, out of which 40.8% had children under the age of 18 living with them, 68.1% were married couples living together, 5.9% had a female householder with no husband present, and 21.6% were non-families. 16.9% of all households were made up of individuals, and 5.7% had someone living alone who was 65 years of age or older.  The average household size was 2.82 and the average family size was 3.18.

In the township the population was spread out, with 30.4% under the age of 18, 6.9% from 18 to 24, 30.5% from 25 to 44, 23.4% from 45 to 64, and 8.8% who were 65 years of age or older.  The median age was 35 years. For every 100 females, there were 103.1 males.  For every 100 females age 18 and over, there were 102.8 males.

The median income for a household in the township was $48,519, and the median income for a family was $50,573. Males had a median income of $36,921 versus $27,344 for females. The per capita income for the township was $19,216.  About 3.4% of families and 5.0% of the population were below the poverty line, including 3.4% of those under age 18 and 5.7% of those age 65 or over.

Education
Tri County Area Schools serves the township. Tri County High School and Tri County Middle School are in the township.

References

External links
 Pierson Township, Michigan
  Pierson Township information
  County link to Pierson Township

Townships in Montcalm County, Michigan
Townships in Michigan